Angola competed at the 1992 Summer Olympics in Barcelona, Spain.

Competitors
The following is the list of number of competitors in the Games.

Athletics

Men

Track and road events

Field events

Women

Track and road events

Basketball

Men's Team Competition 
Preliminary round - Group A

Classification Matches

Classification 9th-12th

 79-69 

9th Place Match

 75-78 

Team Roster:
 (4.) Benjamin Romano 
 (5.) Anibal Moreira
 (6.) Angelo Victoriano
 (7.) Benjamin Ucuahamba
 (8.) Herlander Coimbra
 (9.) Manuel Sousa
 (10.) Antonio de Carvalho
 (11.) Nelson Sardinha
 (12.) David Dias
 (13.) Paulo Macedo
 (14.) José Guimarães
 (15.) Jean Jacques Conceição

Boxing

Judo

Men

Sailing

Men

Swimming

Men

Women

References

External links
Official Olympic Reports

Nations at the 1992 Summer Olympics
1992
Olympics